Berberis laidivo is a species of plant in the family Berberidaceae. It is endemic to Ecuador.  Its natural habitat is subtropical or tropical high-altitude grassland.

The species is listed as "Data deficient".

References

Endemic flora of Ecuador
laidivo
Data deficient plants
Plants described in 1966
Taxonomy articles created by Polbot